Col. Shawkat Ali (27 January 193716 November 2020) was a Bangladeshi politician who served as a deputy speaker of the Jatiya Sangsad. He was a member of the Awami League. He was one of the accused in the historic Agartala Conspiracy Case and a freedom fighter in the Liberation War of Bangladesh.

Early life 

Ali was born in Shariatpur, British India (now in Bangladesh), to Munshi Mobarak and Maleka Begum. He was the eldest son among nine children. Shawkat completed his LL.B. from Comilla Law College under the University of Dhaka in 1958 before he joined the Pakistan Army as a commissioned officer the following year.

Agartala Conspiracy Case 

Ali was a captain in 1968 when he was Accused No. 26 of the 35 implicated in the Agartala Conspiracy Case as a conspirator to secede East Pakistan from Pakistan. Initially, he was supposed to be tried before a court-martial, but the Government of Pakistan felt they would benefit more from a civil trial. The charges were dropped the next year amidst public protest; Ali was still forced to retire in 1969.

Although it was largely thought that the case was only meant to frame Sheikh Mujibur Rahman and others, in 2010, and on the anniversary of the withdrawal of the case on 22 February 2011, Ali confessed to the Parliament at a point of order that the charges read out to them were accurate, stating that they formed a Shangram Parishad (action committee) under Rahman for the sedition and secession of East Pakistan.

Time in the Bangladesh Army 

After Bangladesh declared independence from Pakistan and the war broke out, Ali was reinstated into the army after the formation of the Bangladesh Forces in 1971 to fight the Bangladesh Liberation War. He was forced to retire the second time when he was a colonel in 1975 working as the Director of Ordnance Services following the assassination of Sheikh Mujibur Rahman, since he was close to Mujib.

Political career 

Ali was elected to parliament in the 1979, 1991, 1996, 2001 and 2008 general elections. During his time in office, he has served in various parliamentary committees, including the Standing Committee on Ministry of Shipping and Committee on Private Members Bills and Resolutions as their chairman between 1996 and 2001. He was also a lawyer registered under the Supreme Court.

Ali was selected the Deputy Speaker of the ninth parliament on 25 January 2009, following a landslide Awami League victory. When Speaker Abdul Hamid was acting President and later elected President, Ali was Acting Speaker of National Parliament.

During his time as the Deputy Speaker, Ali chaired many sessions of the parliament when the Speaker Abdul Hamid was absent.

Personal life 

Ali authored two books, one in English and the other in Bangla, both about the Agartala Conspiracy Case. He was married and had two sons, Firoze Shawkat Ali, Khaled Shawkat Ali, and a daughter, Marina Shawkat Ali.

Death 
Ali died on 16 November 2020 at the age of 83.

References

External links

1937 births
2020 deaths
People from Naria Upazila
University of Dhaka alumni
People of the Bangladesh Liberation War
Bangladesh Army colonels
Awami League politicians
Deputy Speakers of the Jatiya Sangsad
5th Jatiya Sangsad members
8th Jatiya Sangsad members
7th Jatiya Sangsad members
9th Jatiya Sangsad members
10th Jatiya Sangsad members
Pakistan Army officers